Taihu may refer to the following in China:

Lake Tai (太湖), freshwater lake on the borders of Jiangsu and Zhejiang provinces

Named after the lake 
 Taihu Bridge, a bridge in Suzhou, Jiangsu
 Taihu pig, a domestic breed of pig
 Taihu rocks
 Taihu Square Station, a metro station of Line 1, Wuxi Metro
 Taihu Wu dialects

Administrative divisions
Taihu Subdistrict (太湖街道), Binhu District, Wuxi, Jiangsu
Taihu County (太湖县), Anqing, Anhui
Taihu, Beijing (台湖镇), a town in Tongzhou District, Beijing
Taihu, Zhuzhou, a rural township in Zhuzhou County, Hunan Province